Monroe City can refer to several places in the United States:
Monroe City, Illinois, a small unincorporated community in the historic Bluff Precinct of Monroe County
Monroe City, Indiana, a town in Harrison Township, Knox County
Monroe City, Missouri, a city in Marion, Monroe, and Ralls counties 
Monroe City, Georgia, a city in and the county seat of Walton County

See also
 Monroe (disambiguation)